Felix Baldauf (born 22 October 1994) is a Norwegian Greco-Roman wrestler. He won the gold medal in the men's 98 kg event at the 2017 European Wrestling Championships held in Novi Sad, Serbia.

Career 

In 2015, he represented Norway at the European Games in the men's 98 kg event without winning a medal. He was eliminated from the competition in his first match by Vilius Laurinaitis.

He competed in the men's 98 kg event at the 2017 World Wrestling Championships held in Paris, France. He was eliminated in his second match by Rustam Assakalov of Uzbekistan. In 2018, he competed in the men's 97 kg event at the World Wrestling Championships held in Budapest, Hungary. He was eliminated in his second match by Artur Aleksanyan of Armenia.

In 2019, he competed in the men's 97 kg event at the European Wrestling Championships held in Bucharest, Romania. In that same year, he won one of the bronze medals in the men's 97 kg event at the 2019 European Games held in Minsk, Belarus. In his bronze medal match he defeated Cenk İldem of Turkey. In 2019, he also competed in the men's 97 kg event at the World Wrestling Championships held in Nur-Sultan, Kazakhstan where he was eliminated in his first match by Mélonin Noumonvi of France.

In March 2021, he was scheduled to compete at the European Olympic Qualification Tournament in Budapest, Hungary but he was unable to do so as he tested positive for COVID-19. In May 2021, he was able to compete at the World Olympic Qualification Tournament held in Sofia, Bulgaria but he failed to qualify. He won his first match but he was then eliminated in his next match by Nikoloz Kakhelashvili of Italy.

In 2022, he won one of the bronze medals in his event at the Vehbi Emre & Hamit Kaplan Tournament held in Istanbul, Turkey. He lost his bronze medal match in the 97 kg event at the 2022 European Wrestling Championships held in Budapest, Hungary. A few months later, he competed at the Matteo Pellicone Ranking Series 2022 held in Rome, Italy. He competed in the 97kg event at the 2022 World Wrestling Championships held in Belgrade, Serbia.

He won the gold medal in his event at the 2023 Dan Kolov & Nikola Petrov Tournament held in Sofia, Bulgaria.

Achievements

References

External links 
 

Living people
1994 births
Place of birth missing (living people)
Norwegian male sport wrestlers
Wrestlers at the 2015 European Games
Wrestlers at the 2019 European Games
European Games bronze medalists for Norway
European Games medalists in wrestling
European Wrestling Championships medalists
21st-century Norwegian people